The Texas Kid is a 1943 American Western film directed by Lambert Hillyer. This is the fifth film in the "Marshal Nevada Jack McKenzie" series, and stars Johnny Mack Brown as Jack McKenzie and Raymond Hatton as his sidekick Sandy Hopkins, with Marshall Reed, Shirley Patterson and Robert Fiske.

Cast
Johnny Mack Brown as Nevada Jack McKenzie 
Raymond Hatton as Sandy Hopkins 
Marshall Reed as MacLaine - aka The Texas Kid 
Shirley Patterson as Nancy Drew 
Robert Fiske as Naylor 
Edmund Cobb as Scully 
George J. Lewis as Murdered Stage Driver 
Cyril Ring as Tim Atwood 
Lynton Brent as Jess - Henchman 
Stanley Price as Ed - Henchman 
Bud Osborne as Steve - Henchman 
Kermit Maynard as Alex - Henchman

References

Bibliography
Martin, Len D. The Allied Artists Checklist: The Feature Films and Short Subjects of Allied Artists Pictures Corporation, 1947-1978. McFarland & Company, 1993.

External links

1943 films
1943 Western (genre) films
American Western (genre) films
Films directed by Lambert Hillyer
Monogram Pictures films
American black-and-white films
1940s American films
1940s English-language films